Tom Mattera (born 27 January 1979) is an American filmmaker, writer and producer.

Early life
Mattera was born and grew up in South Philadelphia. Tom Mattera and Dave Mazzoni teamed up during childhood in Philadelphia where they began their creative collaboration on film. Their first screenplay, Mectl, was selected as one of the top 250 out of 5,500 submissions in HBO’s Project Greenlight Competition in 2003.

Mattera graduated with a B.A. in Film and Media Arts in 2004 from Temple University, where he studied underneath award winning filmmaker Eugene Martin (Edge City, Diary of a City Priest). Mattera also holds a B.S. in Civil & Construction Engineering from Temple University which he received in 2002.

Features

The 4th Dimension
Tom Mattera directed his first feature film with Dave Mazzoni, The 4th Dimension, in 2006. The film depicts Jack is a loner confined to a workbench in the back of an antique shop. When a mysterious woman presents him with a broken antique clock that is not to be fixed, unexplainable events begin to occur. After finding Albert Einstein's journal on his still unsolved Unified Field Theory, Jack becomes obsessed with analyzing time and theorizing its connection to his supernatural experiences, his surreal dreams, and his perception of reality, only to lead to the discovery of the biggest mystery of all - himself. Mattera and Mazzoni made the film for just $75,000. The film  won the Grand Jury Honorable Mention Award at CineVegas in 2006, the Technical Achievement Award at the Philadelphia International Film Festival, and went on to screen at over 20 international film festivals.

Upcoming Projects

The Fields
Mattera and Mazzoni recently directed their second independent feature, "The Fields," a thriller starring Academy Award Winner Cloris Leachman and Tara Reid, which is scheduled for a 2011 release. The film takes place in a small Pennsylvania town in 1973, and tells the story of a young boy and his family as they are terrorized by an unseen presence in the surrounding fields. The film is being produced by Faust Checho with Mr. Big Productions, in association with MazWa Productions. Tommy Lee Wallace is attached as an associate producer.[4] Production spanned six weeks, throughout September and October 2009, and was shot 100% on location in the Pocono Mountains region in Kunkletown Pennsylvania. The Fields was signed to distribution company Breaking Glass pictures.

Directorial style
Mattera & Mazzoni's film The 4th Dimension has often been compared to David Lynch and Darren Aronofsky.

Filmography

References

1979 births
Living people